Ratu Meli Derenalagi (born 26 November 1998) is a forward in the Fiji national rugby sevens team. Derenalagi is well known for his offloading ability. His uncles Semisi Naevo, Apenisa Naevo and father Ratu Vuniani Derenalagi have also played for Fiji in rugby sevens.

Career 
He won the rookie of the year in 2019. He captained the fiji 7s side to their first Sydney Sevens title in 2020 with a thrilling 12-10 win over South Africa in the final.

He was selected to Fijian squad to compete at the 2020 Summer Olympics in the men's rugby sevens tournament. He was also subsequently part of the Fijian side which claimed gold medal after defeating New Zealand 24-12 at the 2020 Summer Olympics.

References

External links

1998 births
Living people
Fijian rugby sevens players
Rugby sevens players at the 2020 Summer Olympics
Olympic rugby sevens players of Fiji
Olympic gold medalists for Fiji
Olympic medalists in rugby sevens
Medalists at the 2020 Summer Olympics
Fijian Drua players
Fijian rugby union players
Rugby union flankers